Psilotrichum aphyllum is a species of plant in the family Amaranthaceae. It is endemic to Socotra off the coast of Yemen.  Its natural habitats are subtropical or tropical dry forests and rocky areas.

References

Endemic flora of Socotra
aphyllum
Endangered plants
Taxonomy articles created by Polbot